Cañon Fiord is a natural inlet in the west of Ellesmere Island, Nunavut in the Arctic Archipelago. To the north, it opens into Greely Fiord and to the east lies the Agassiz Ice Cap.

References

Ellesmere Island
Fjords of Qikiqtaaluk Region